Singanna Palem is a village of India, located in the Prakasam District of Andhra Pradesh. The number of households in the village is nearly 1,000, with a total population of 1706.

References 

Villages in Prakasam district